Willie Standard Time is a 1996 album by country singer Willie Nelson. The album is composed of 10 budget tracks, which are all covers featuring famous songs like "Wind Beneath My Wings" and "Stormy Weather." The album was a perfect Willie Nelson sampler for budget-centered fans of the time.

Track listing
"Stormy Weather" (Arlen, Koehler) – 2:23
"Don't Get Around Much Anymore" (Ellington, Russell) – 2:32
"Ole Buttermilk Sky" (Carmichael) – 2:49
"Wind Beneath My Wings" (Larry Henley, Sibar) – 3:48
"I'm Gonna Sit Right Down (And Write Myself a Letter)" (Ahlert, Young) – 2:57
"Am I Blue" (Akst, Clarke) – 2:17
"Unchained Melody" (North, Zaret) – 3:48
"Exactly Like You" (McHugh, Fields) – 2:24
"Old Fashioned Love" (Mack, Johnson) – 2:50
"That Lucky Old Sun (Just Rolls Around Heaven All Day)" (Smith, Gillespie) – 2:39

Personnel
Willie Nelson – guitar, vocals

References

1996 compilation albums
Willie Nelson compilation albums
Sony Records compilation albums